Alcolapia ndalalani, the narrow-mouthed Natron tilapia, is a species of small fish in the family Cichlidae. It is endemic to the hypersaline, warm Lake Natron in Tanzania. Here it lives in creeks and springs at the southern shores of the lake. It has a relatively narrow, downturned mouth, which separates it from the two other fish in Lake Natron, A. alcalica and A. latilabris.

References

ndalalani
Fish described in 1999
Taxa named by Lothar Seegers